Jānis Jaunsudrabiņš (August 25, 1877 in Nereta – August 25, 1962 in Körbecke) was a Latvian writer and painter and one of the most popular authors of the first Republic of Latvia between the two world wars.

Biography 
Between 1886–1892 he attended school in Nereta. Thereafter from 1892 until 1893 Jānis went to Panemunis in a russian school. He studied at the Vecsaté Agricultural School from 1895 to 1897. In 1896 he published the first short story, "Winter Night", in the Latvian Aviation Newspaper. From 1898 on he worked as an agricultural specialist in Remte, but was attracted to art later. From 1899 to 1903 he studied at Blum School of Painting in Riga, Latvia. In 1905 he had three months of training in Munich, Germany. Three years after he lived and studied art with his family for one year in Berlin, with his teacher Lovis Corinth. Thereafter he returned and lived in Milgravis from 1913. From 1915 to 1918 he lived in the Caucasus. On his return he engaged in painting and writing. In 1924 he traveled Europe with a grant from the Cultural Foundation. In 1937 he got divorced from his wife Sabile Ilūkste. In 1944 he was retreated to the west.

Works 

He painted landscapes, portraits, illustrated books (including his own), wrote articles on art, including on M. K. Čiurlionis.

The story "The Frosty Rings" reveals the love drama of two young people. The experience of childhood is reflected in the "White Paper", "Green Paper", and other collections. The prose has a strong tradition of psychological realism and neo-romanticism. The works subtly convey the spiritual experiences of the characters, despite the life of various strata of rural Latvia, emphasize human connection with nature, continuation of national traditions; Latvian motives abound. He has written pictures, short stories and poems, plays, books on Latvian emigration, and descriptions of Latvians in various countries.

Legacy 
In 1965 Jānis Jaunsudrabiņš Prose Prize was created.

Bibliography 
 Frosty Rings, 1907
 White Paper, 1914
 Green Paper, 2 d. 1950 – 1951,
 Aija, 1911, Echo, 1914–1915, Winter, 1925 trilogy
 Dance of Death, novel, 1924 
 The Newcomer and the Devil, novel, 1933 
 Don't Look at the Sun, novel, 1936 
 Capri, novel, 1939 
 Money, novel, 1942 
 Uršulytė, short story, 1929
 Without Homeland, 1947
 I tell my wife, 1951
 My Life, 1957

References

1877 births
1962 deaths
Latvian writers
Latvian painters